Mandalapuram is a village and Gram panchayat of Nakrekal mandal, Nalgonda district, in Telangana state.

References

Villages in Nalgonda district